Penelope Summerfield, FBA, FRHistS, FAcSS (born 1951), commonly known as Penny Summerfield, is an English historian and retired academic.

Early life and education 
Born in 1951 in London, Summerfield is the daughter of Arthur Summerfield, a professor, and Aline Whalley, a psychologist. She attended the University of Sussex, graduating with a BA in 1973, an MA in 1976 and a DPhil in 1982. Her doctoral studies were supervised by Stephen Yeo.

Career and honours 
Summerfield was a research assistant and tutor at Durham University from 1976 to 1978. She then taught at the Lancaster University from 1978, first as a lecturer in the social history of education, and latterly as Professor of Women's History (1994–2000). She moved to the University of Manchester in 2000 to be Professor of Modern History; there, she served as head of the School of History and Classics (2002–2003) and the School of Arts, Histories and Cultures (2003–2006).

In 2020, Summerfield was elected a fellow of the British Academy, the United Kingdom's national academy for the humanities and social sciences. She is also a fellow of the Academy of Social Sciences and the Royal Historical Society, and was the chair of the Social History Society from 2008 to 2011.

Personal life 
She was married to the management studies academic and Lancaster University professor Mark Easterby-Smith, with whom she had two children before they divorced; their daughter is the historian Sarah Easterby-Smith. Summerfield later married Oliver Fulton, an emeritus professor of higher education at Lancaster University and the son of the university administrator John Fulton, Baron Fulton.

Bibliography

Books

Thesis

Peer-reviewed articles and chapters

References 

1951 births
English historians
Alumni of the University of Sussex
Academics of Lancaster University
Academics of the University of Manchester
Fellows of the British Academy
Fellows of the Royal Historical Society
Fellows of the Academy of Social Sciences
Living people